Michael D. Gleason (November 16, 1876 – January 11, 1923) was an American rower, born in Philadelphia, who competed in the 1904 Summer Olympics. In 1904, he was part of the American boat, which won the gold medal in the eights.

References

External links
 
 

1876 births
1923 deaths
Rowers from Philadelphia
Rowers at the 1904 Summer Olympics
Olympic gold medalists for the United States in rowing
American male rowers
Medalists at the 1904 Summer Olympics